The 2019–20 season was Budapest Honvéd FC's 109th competitive season, 15th consecutive season in the OTP Bank Liga and 110th year in existence as a football club.

First team squad

Transfers

Summer

In:

Out:

Winter

In:

Out:

Source:

Competitions

Overview

Nemzeti Bajnokság I

League table

Results summary

Results by round

Matches

Hungarian Cup

UEFA Europa League

First qualifying round

Second qualifying round

Statistics

Appearances and goals
Last updated on 27 June 2020.

|-
|colspan="14"|Out to loan:

|-
|colspan="14"|Players no longer at the club:

|}

Top scorers
Includes all competitive matches. The list is sorted by shirt number when total goals are equal.
Last updated on 27 June 2020

Disciplinary record
Includes all competitive matches. Players with 1 card or more included only.

Last updated on 27 June 2020

Overall
{|class="wikitable"
|-
|Games played || 47 (33 OTP Bank Liga, 4 UEFA Europa League and 10 Hungarian Cup)
|-
|Games won || 19 (12 OTP Bank Liga, 1 UEFA Europa League and 6 Hungarian Cup)
|-
|Games drawn || 14 (8 OTP Bank Liga, 3 UEFA Europa League and 3 Hungarian Cup)
|-
|Games lost || 14 (13 OTP Bank Liga, 0 UEFA Europa League and 1 Hungarian Cup)
|-
|Goals scored || 58
|-
|Goals conceded || 51
|-
|Goal difference || +7
|-
|Yellow cards || 110
|-
|Red cards ||6 
|-
|rowspan="1"|Worst discipline ||  Ivan Lović (12 , 0 )
|-
|rowspan="1"|Best result || 7–1 (A) v Dunaharaszti - Hungarian Cup - 21-9-2019
|-
|rowspan="2"|Worst result || 0–4 (H) v Diósgyőr - Nemzeti Bajnokság I - 29-2-2020
|-
| 1–5 (H) v Kisvárda - Nemzeti Bajnokság I - 14-3-2020
|-
|rowspan="1"|Most appearances ||  Đorđe Kamber (44 appearances)
|-
|rowspan="1"|Top scorer ||  Davide Lanzafame (13 goals)
|-
|Points || 71/141 (50.35%)
|-

References

External links
 Official website
 UEFA
 Fixtures and results

Budapest Honvéd FC seasons
Hungarian football clubs 2019–20 season